West Madaket was a steam cargo ship built in 1918–1919 by Skinner & Eddy Corporation of Seattle for the United States Shipping Board as part of the wartime shipbuilding program of the Emergency Fleet Corporation (EFC) to restore the nation's Merchant Marine.

Construction
West Madaket was built in 1918 as a commercial cargo ship at Seattle, Washington by the Skinner and Eddy Corporation. Launched on 5 October 1918, she was acquired by the U.S. Navy for World War I service upon completion on 31 October 1918, assigned naval registry Identification Number (Id. No.) 3636, and commissioned the same day as USS West Madaket at Puget Sound Navy Yard, Bremerton, Washington.

Assigned to the Naval Overseas Transportation Service, West Madaket completed her sea trials too late to see service before World War I ended on 11 November 1918. She departed for the United States East Coast on 18 November 1918 with a cargo of 7,031 tons of flour consigned to European food relief. Voyaging via the Panama Canal, she arrived at New York City on 16 December 1918 and departed on 22 December 1918, bound for Europe. She made port at Falmouth, England, on 5 January 1919 and pushed on, that same day, for Rotterdam, the Netherlands, where she discharged her cargo until 23 January 1919.

Returning to New York on 9 February 1919, West Madaket loaded 6,841 tons of general cargo and made a voyage to Le Verdon-sur-Mer, France, returning to New York on 28 April 1919.

West Madaket was decommissioned on 8 May 1919 at Newport News, Virginia, and was transferred to the United States Shipping Board on the same day.

Once again SS West Madaket, she remained in the custody of the Shipping Board until the United States Maritime Commission was established and replaced the Shipping Board in 1936. She then continued in Maritime Commission service into World War II.

References

NavSource Online: Section Patrol Craft Photo Archive: West Madaket (ID 3636)

 

Design 1013 ships
Design 1013 ships of the United States Navy
Ships built by Skinner & Eddy
1918 ships
World War I cargo ships of the United States
World War I auxiliary ships of the United States
World War II merchant ships of the United States
Ships sunk by German submarines in World War II
World War II shipwrecks in the Atlantic Ocean
Maritime incidents in May 1943